Rhea Clyman (originally spelled Kleiman; July 4, 1904–1981) was a Polish-born Canadian journalist who travelled the USSR and reported about the Holodomor. She was famously expelled from the USSR in 1932.

Early life

Rhea Clyman was born on July 4, 1904, in Poland to a Jewish family. Her parents were Solomon and Anna Kleiman. In 1906 the family moved to Canada and settled in Toronto, Ontario. When Clyman was five or six, she was hit by a streetcar and badly injured, requiring the amputation of one leg and many subsequent hospital visits. As her father had died, she left school early, working in a factory to help support her family.

Career
As a young woman, Clyman worked in New York and then moved to London. She worked as a researcher for New York Times reporter Walter Duranty, and then took a job as a foreign correspondent for the London Daily Express.

In 1928, at 24, Clyman travelled to the USSR to report on Soviet reforms. However, she was exposed to the realities of the regime. She wrote for many newspapers, including the Toronto Telegram and the London Daily Express. She travelled to the far north labour camps and travelled south to Soviet Georgia by car with two women from Atlanta. On the way, they encountered starving Ukrainian peasants in Kharkiv. When Clyman arrived in Tbilisi, Georgia, she was arrested on the charge of reporting false news about the USSR and soon deported.

From 1933 to 1938, she worked in Nazi Germany, reporting for the London Daily Telegraph. In 1938, she had to leave the country urgently because of growing reprisals against the Jews. The plane she was riding crashed while landing in Amsterdam; Clyman was injured but survived and recovered.

From 1938 to 1941, she worked in Montreal as a correspondent for London Daily Express, and then moved to New York, where she led a quiet life until she died in 1981. She never married or had children.

Memorials 
Clyman was portrayed by actress Beata Pozniak in the 2019 feature film about Gareth Jones, Mr. Jones.

She is also the title character of the 2018 documentary Hunger for Truth: The Rhea Clyman Story.

References 

1904 births
1981 deaths
Canadian newspaper journalists
Polish emigrants to Canada
Jewish Canadian journalists
Canadian people of Polish-Jewish descent
Journalists from Toronto
Canadian emigrants to the United States
20th-century Canadian journalists
Canadian women journalists
Canadian amputees
20th-century Canadian women writers